The 2016 FIBA U16 European Championship Division C was played in Nicosia, Cyprus, from 17 to 24 July 2016. Ten teams participated in the competition. Cyprus won their third title in this competition by beating Azerbaijan in the final, 62–50.

Participating teams

 (hosts)

First round

Group A

Group B

Classification round

5th–8th place playoffs

Ninth place game

Seventh place game

Fifth place game

Championship playoffs

Semifinals

Third place game

Final

Final standings

References

External links
FIBA official website

C
2016–17 in European basketball
2016 in Cypriot sport
International basketball competitions hosted by Cyprus
Sport in Nicosia
July 2016 sports events in Europe
FIBA U16 European Championship Division C